Overseas Vietnamese (or ) refers to Vietnamese people who live outside Vietnam. There are approximately 5 million overseas Vietnamese, the largest community of whom live in the United States.  The oldest wave of overseas Vietnamese left Vietnam as economic and political refugees after the 1975 fall of Saigon and the North Vietnamese annexation of South Vietnam.

Overseas Vietnamese make up the fifth largest Asian diaspora, after the Indian diaspora, Overseas Chinese, Overseas Filipinos and the Lebanese diaspora.

The term Việt Kiều 越僑 ("Vietnamese sojourner") is used by people in Vietnam to refer to Vietnamese living outside the country and is not a term of self-identification. However, many overseas Vietnamese prefer the terms  𠊛越海外 ("Overseas Vietnamese") or  𠊛越自由 ("free Vietnamese").

History

Overseas Vietnamese can be divided into distinct categories: 
People who left Vietnam before 1975. This population usually resides in neighboring countries, such as Cambodia, Laos, Thailand and China, as well as those who settled in Korea and Japan before French colonization. During the French colonial era, many Vietnamese also migrated to France as students or workers. These people are not often considered Việt Kiều by people residing in Vietnam.
People who fled Vietnam in the immediate aftermath of the Vietnam War, many of them via Operation New Life and Operation Babylift, and their descendants. This is the largest Vietnamese diaspora group, found mainly in North America, Western Europe, Hong Kong, and Australasia.
People who migrated legitimately from Vietnam to other parts of the Soviet bloc during the Cold War era and chose to remain outside Vietnam after the Soviet collapse, and their descendants. This is the second-largest Vietnamese diaspora group, found mainly in the former Soviet Union and the ex-Warsaw Pact countries of Eastern Europe.
Economic migrants who work in other Asian countries such Taiwan, Japan and South Korea. This includes Vietnamese women who married men from these countries through illegal marriage agencies. These agencies are the source of social tension, controversy, and have been criticized for resembling human trafficking. Many women in this category suffer violence by their foreign husbands. 
Vietnamese living in the Middle East and North Africa, in particular the United Arab Emirates, Egypt, Morocco, Qatar and Kuwait. Many members of this population studied overseas and sought work in other countries.

According to a 2014 report by the Associated Press, "women make up at least two-thirds of workers who leave the country", and sometimes leave fathers behind to care for children. The report also said that "the total amount of remittances sent back from all Vietnamese workers overseas now exceeds $2 billion a year."

In addition, as of 2020, 190,000 Vietnamese were studying abroad. Most were studying in Australia (30,000), the United States (29,000), Canada (21,000), the UK (12,000) and Asian countries (70,000); as well as an unknown number of illegal Vietnamese immigrants, as unveiled by the Essex lorry deaths throughout massive networks of illegal human trades spanned from Asia to Europe.

Around the World

United States

Vietnamese immigrants in the United States are one of the largest immigrant communities in the world. The community grew from 231,000 in 1980 to perhaps as many as 1.3 million in 2012. Most immigrants fled to the United States as refugees in the wake of the Vietnam War, arriving in three distinct waves from the 1960s to the 1990s. The first wave consisted mainly of South Vietnamese military personnel and citizens targeted by communist forces because of their associations with both the South Vietnamese government and the United States.

The second wave, which occurred in the 1970s, brought rural Vietnamese to the United States in what became known as the "boat people crisis". This wave was characterized by people who lacked the education or wealth of the first wave, as well as a large number of ethnic Chinese who were fleeing persecution by the Vietnamese government.

The final wave took place in the 1980s into the 1990s. A majority of these immigrants were the children of Vietnamese mothers and American soldiers, and they greatly increased the population of Vietnamese in America. By 2012, this population constituted 31% of the 4 million foreign-born population from South East Asia, 11% of the 11.9 million foreign-born from Asia, and 3% of the 40.8 million overall foreign-born population.

Mass migration from Vietnam began in response to the Vietnamese government in the 1970s. During the North Vietnamese military offensive of mid-March 1975, many South Vietnamese citizens were pushed farther and farther south into Saigon. On April 30, the final U.S. troops and diplomats left Saigon and the country came under the control of the Provisional Revolutionary Government. As a result, the North Vietnamese Army (NVA) took control of the country and many Vietnamese became refugees and immigrated to the United States.

By 1979, the United Nations recognized that the Vietnamese refugee crisis was a "world problem", which led to the First Geneva Conference on Indochinese Refugees in July, 1979. The United States, United Kingdom, Australia, France, and Canada each agreed to accept refugees for resettlement, and Vietnamese refugee entries to the U.S. to peaked from 1979 to 1982.  That year, President Jimmy Carter doubled the number of Southeast Asian refugees accepted into the United States, from 7,000 to 14,000. However, 62% of Americans said they disapproved of the measure.

The South Vietnamese coming to the U.S. in the second wave did not come willingly. They were forced out of their homes by the N.V.A. and sought refuge in the United States. Many of these people felt betrayed by the U.S.'s handling of the situation in Vietnam and felt conflicted about making the journey there. Nearly all the Vietnamese migrants to the United States during this time were listed as refugees, not as immigrants, because of the forced manner in which they had been exiled to the United States; 99% of Vietnamese newcomers to the United States who received a Green Card in 1982 fell into this category. In 2016 the U.S. Census Bureau estimated the Vietnamese American population to be 2,067,527. The majority live in metropolitan areas in the western half of the country, especially in California and Texas. There are particularly large communities in Orange County, California, San Jose, California, Houston, Texas and Seattle, Washington. Those who fled to escape the North Vietnamese takeover are generally antagonistic toward the communist government of Vietnam.
In the United States, Vietnamese immigrants have achieved high levels of education. In 2015, 30% of Vietnamese Americans had attained a bachelor's degree or higher (compared to 19% for the general population). Specifically, 21% of Vietnamese Americans had attained a bachelor's degree (37% for U.S. born Vietnamese and 18% for foreign-born Vietnamese), and 8.9% had attained a postgraduate degree (14% for U.S. born Vietnamese and 7% for foreign-born Vietnamese), compared to 11% postgraduate degree attainment among the general American population.

Cambodia

Vietnamese constitute about 5% of the population of Cambodia, making them the largest ethnic minority. Vietnamese people began migrating to Cambodia as early as the 17th century. In 1863, when Cambodia became a French colony, many Vietnamese were brought to Cambodia by the French to work on plantations and occupy civil servant positions. During the Lon Nol regime (1970–1975) and Pol Pot regime (1975–1979), many Vietnamese living in Cambodia were killed. Others were either repatriated or escaped to Vietnam or Thailand. During the ten-year Vietnamese occupation of Cambodia from 1979 to 1989 many Vietnamese who had previously lived in Cambodia returned and along with them came friends and relatives. Many former South Vietnamese soldiers also came to Cambodia, fleeing persecution from the communist government.

Many living in Cambodia usually speak Vietnamese as their first language and have introduced the Cao Dai religion, with 2 temples built in Cambodia. Many Cambodians learned Vietnamese as a result. They are concentrated in the Kratie and Takeo provinces of Cambodia, where villages predominately consist of ethnic Vietnamese.

Vietnamese people are also the top tourist group in Cambodia, with 130,831, up 19% as of 2011.

China

The Vietnamese in China are known as the Gin ethnic group, arriving in Southeastern China beginning in the 16th century. They largely reside in the province of Guangxi and speak Vietnamese and a local variety of Cantonese.

As of 2020, 79 000 Vietnamese nationals were living in China. They formed the second largest group of expatriates in China, while Burmese nationals were the largest.

France

The number of ethnic Vietnamese living in France is estimated to be about 350,000 as of 2014. France was the first Western country where Vietnamese migrants settled due to the colonization of Vietnam by France that began in the late 1850s. The colonial period saw a significant representation of Vietnamese students in France, as well as professional and blue-collar workers, with many settling permanently. The country would continue to be home to by far the largest overseas Vietnamese population outside Asia until the 1980s, when a higher number of Vietnam War refugees resettled in the United States.

A number of Vietnamese loyal to the colonial government and Vietnamese married to French colonists emigrated to France following Vietnam's independence through the Geneva Accords in 1954. During the Vietnam War, a significant number of students and those involved in commerce from South Vietnam continued to arrive in France. The largest influx of Vietnamese people, however, arrived in France as refugees after the Fall of Saigon and end of the Vietnam War in 1975. Vietnamese refugees who settled in France usually had higher levels of education and affluence than Vietnamese refugees who settled in North America, Australia, and the rest of Europe, likely due to cultural familiarity with French culture and that many affluent Vietnamese families had already settled in France.

Most Vietnamese in France live in Paris and the surrounding Île-de-France area, but a significant number also reside in major urban centers in the south-east of the country, primarily Marseille, Lyon, and Toulouse. Earlier Vietnamese migrants also settled in the cities of Lille and Bordeaux. In contrast to their counterparts in the English-speaking world, the Vietnamese in France have a higher degree of assimilation, due to cultural, historical, and linguistic knowledge of the host country.

The community is still strongly attached to its homeland while being well integrated in French society. The generation of Vietnamese refugees continues to hold on to traditional values. The later generations of French-born Vietnamese strongly identify with French culture rather than Vietnamese, as most were raised and brought up in the French system rather than the Vietnamese one. French media and politicians generally view the Vietnamese community as a "model minority", in part because they are represented as having a high degree of integration within the French society as well as having high economic and academic success. Furthermore, Vietnamese in France on average have a high level of educational attainment and success, a legacy dating back to the colonial era when affluent families and those with connections to the French colonial government sent their children to France to study.

The Vietnamese community in France is divided between those who oppose the communist Hanoi government and those who are supportive of it. The pro-communist camp is the more established of the two and was the larger group until the 1970s, consisting mainly of students, workers, and long-established immigrants who arrived before 1975 and their descendants. Meanwhile, the anti-communist camp consists of students, refugees and middle-class immigrants, who began to arrive after 1954, but most of whom fled Vietnam from the South Vietnam after 1975.

This division in the community has been present since the 1950s when some Vietnamese students and workers in France supported and praised the communist Viet Minh's policies back home, while Vietnamese loyal to the colonial or non-communist governments and immigrated to France were largely anti-communist. This political rift remained minor until the Fall of Saigon in 1975 when staunchly anti-communist refugees from South Vietnam arrived and established community networks and institutions. The two camps have contradictory political goals and ideologies, and members of one group rarely interact with those of the other group. Such political divisions have prevented the Vietnamese in France from forming a strong, unified community in their host nation, as their counterparts have in North America and Australia (1980).

Australia

Vietnamese people in Australia constitute one of the largest ethnic groups in Australia, with 294,798 people claiming Vietnamese ancestry at the 2016 census. First generation Vietnamese Australians who came as refugees varied widely in income and social class. Of those from the Vietnam War era, many Vietnamese Australians are white collar professionals, while others work primarily in blue-collar jobs. Australian-born Vietnamese tend to earn high levels of educational attainment and success. In 2001, the labour participation rate for Vietnamese refugees was 61%, about the same as that of Australian born residents (63%). Around three quarters of ethnic Vietnamese live in New South Wales (40.7%) and Victoria (36.8%).

The surname, Nguyễn, is the seventh most common family name in Australia (second to Smith in the Melbourne phone book).

New Zealand

According to the 2018 census, 10,086 New Zealanders identify themselves with the Vietnamese ethnic group. Many of them came to New Zealand to escape religious persecution or war.

Canada

According to the 2016 census, Canada has 240,615 people who identify as ethnic Vietnamese. The majority of Vietnamese people in Canada reside in the provinces of Ontario and Quebec, with some having lived in Quebec before 1975. Vancouver is also another major destination for newly arrived Vietnamese immigrants since 1980, including Vietnamese of Chinese descent, with the city having a large Chinese population.

Germany

Vietnamese are the largest Asian ethnic group in Germany. As of 2019, there are about 188,000 people of Vietnamese descent in Germany. In Western Germany, most Vietnamese arrived in the 1970s or 1980s as refugees from the Vietnam War. The comparatively larger Vietnamese community in Eastern Germany traces its origins to assistance agreements between the East German and the North Vietnamese government. Under these agreements, guest workers from Vietnam were brought to East Germany, where they soon made up the largest immigrant group and were provided with technical training. After the fall of the Berlin Wall, many stayed in Germany, although they often faced discrimination, especially in the early years after reunification.

As in France, the Vietnamese community is divided between anticommunists in the former West (including the former West Berlin) and pro-communists in the former East, although the difference runs along former borderlines rather than being diffused as in France.

Czech Republic

The number of Vietnamese people in the Czech Republic was estimated at 61,012 at the 2009 census, although more recent figures have placed the number as high as 80,000.

Most Vietnamese immigrants in the Czech Republic reside in Prague, where there is an enclave called "Sapa". Unlike Vietnamese immigrants in Western Europe and North America, these immigrants were usually communist cadres studying or working abroad who decided to stay after the collapse of communism in Central and Eastern Europe. The Vietnamese surname Nguyen is even listed as the most common of foreign surnames in the Czech Republic and is the 9th most common surname in the country overall.

United Kingdom

Vietnamese residing in the United Kingdom number around 55,000 people, in contrast to the trend of the U.K. tending to have the largest East and South East Asian diasporas in Europe. In the 1980s, Prime Minister Margaret Thatcher agreed to take quotas of refugees and 12,000 boat people came to Britain. The most established Vietnamese communities in Britain are in Hackney and other parts of London. There are also communities in Birmingham, Manchester and other major U.K. cities. In addition to the official 4.5 million Vietnamese recognized abroad, an underreported number of illegal Vietnamese immigrants abroad reside in the United Kingdom, a part of worldwide criminal activities resembling modern slavery. Many Vietnamese, lacking official papers and denied official assistances, unfortunately, may become involved in criminal activities, such as unknowingly being hired in cannabis factories. The Essex lorry deaths highlighted the issue of illegal Vietnamese immigrants being smuggled from poverty-stricken regions of Vietnam to other parts of the world.

Poland

Around 50,000 Vietnamese live in Poland, mostly in big cities. They publish a number of newspapers, both pro- and anti-Communist. The first immigrants were Vietnamese students at Polish universities in the post-World War II era. These numbers increased slightly during the Vietnam War, when agreements between the communist Vietnamese and Polish governments allowed Vietnamese guest workers to obtain industrial training in Poland. A large number of Vietnamese immigrants also arrived after 1989.

Belgium

An estimated 14,000 ethnic Vietnamese reside in Belgium as of 2012. Similar to the Vietnamese community in France, the Vietnamese Belgian community traces its roots to before the end of the Vietnam War. Beginning in the mid-1960s, Belgium became a popular alternative destination to France for South Vietnamese seeking higher education and career opportunities abroad. A much larger influx of Vietnamese arrived as refugees after the Fall of Saigon. After the Berlin Wall fell in 1989, a small number of Vietnamese workers in former Soviet Bloc countries who were sponsored by the communist Vietnamese government also sought asylum in Belgium.

The Vietnamese Belgian population largely resides in and around the capital of Brussels or in the southern French-speaking Wallonia region, especially around the city of Liège. As in France, South Vietnamese refugees to Belgium were largely of higher social standing and integrated much easier into their host country's society than their peers who settled in North America, Australia and the rest of Europe due to better linguistic and cultural knowledge. The Vietnamese Belgian community is strongly attached to its counterpart community in France, with both communities largely achieving higher socioeconomic success in their host countries than other overseas Vietnamese populations.

Russia

Vietnamese people in Russia form the 72nd-largest ethnic minority community in Russia according to the 2002 census. The census estimated their population at only 26,205 individuals, making them among the smaller groups of Việt Kiều. Unofficial estimates, however, put their population as high as 100,000 to 150,000.

Norway

An estimated 21,700 ethnic Vietnamese live in Norway as of 2014, and the country has hosted a Vietnamese community since refugee arrivals after the end of the Vietnam War in 1975. The Vietnamese are considered among the best integrated non-Western immigrant groups in Norway, with high rates of Norwegian citizenship among immigrants and success rates in education on par with those of ethnic Norwegians.

Netherlands

About 19,000 ethnic Vietnamese reside in the Netherlands according to a 2010 estimate. The community largely consists of South Vietnamese refugees who first arrived in 1978. A much smaller number of North Vietnamese workers also arrived from eastern Europe after the fall of the Berlin Wall.

Bulgaria

An estimated 2,600 ethnic Vietnamese live in Bulgaria according to a 2015 estimate.

Under international agreements in 1980, Bulgaria and other Warsaw Pact members accepted Vietnamese guest workers who were sponsored by the communist government into the country as a relatively inexpensive manual labour workforce. At one point, over 35,000 Vietnamese people worked in Bulgaria between 1980 and 1991 and many Vietnamese students completed their higher education at various Bulgarian universities.

South Korea

As of 2011, there were over 110,000 ethnic Vietnamese people in South Korea, making them the second largest minority group in the country. Vietnamese in South Korea consist mainly of migrant workers and women introduced to South Korean husbands through marriage agencies. In the 13th century, several thousand Vietnamese fled to Korea after the overthrow of the Vietnamese Lý dynasty, where they were received by King Gojong of Goryeo.

Malaysia

The Fall of Saigon in 1975 at the end of the Vietnam War saw many Vietnamese refugees escaping by boats to Malaysia. The first refugee boat arrived in Malaysia in May 1975, carrying 47 people. A refugee camp was established later at Pulau Bidong in August 1978 with assistance of the United Nations and became a major refugee processing center for Vietnamese seeking residency in other countries. While a very small number of Vietnamese refugees settled in Malaysia, the majority of Vietnamese in Malaysia consist of skilled and semi-skilled workers who arrived during the 1990s as economic cooperation between Vietnam and Malaysia increased.

Taiwan

Vietnamese form one of the largest foreign ethnic groups in Taiwan, with a resident population of around 200,000, including students and migrant workers. Vietnamese in Taiwan largely arrived as workers in the manufacturing industry or as domestic helpers. There are also a large number of Vietnamese women married to Taiwanese men through international matchmaking services in Vietnam, despite the illegality of such services in the country.

Japan

Over 135,000 Vietnamese people resided in Japan at the end of 2014. In 2019, around 371,755 Vietnamese people lived in Japan, making it the third largest foreign community in the country. At least 190,000 are "skilled trainees" and this particular number is growing sharply. Vietnamese people first came to Japan as students beginning in the 20th century. Most of the community, however, is composed of refugees admitted in the late 1970s and early 1980s, as well as a smaller proportion of migrant laborers who began arriving in 1994.

Laos

As Vietnam and Laos are neighbors, there has been a long history of population migrations between the territories making up the two respective countries. When Laos was a French protectorate in the first half of the 20th century, the French colonial administration brought many Vietnamese people to Laos to work as civil servants. This policy was the object of strenuous opposition by Laotian nationals, who in the 1930s made an unsuccessful attempt to replace the local government with Laotian civil servants.

Hong Kong

Vietnamese migration to Hong Kong began after the end of the Vietnam War in 1975, when boat people took to the sea and began fleeing Vietnam in all directions. Those who landed in Hong Kong were placed in refugee camps until they could be resettled in a third country. Under the Hong Kong government's Comprehensive Plan of Action, newly arriving Vietnamese were classified as either political refugees or economic migrants. Those deemed to be economic migrants would be denied the opportunity for resettlement overseas.

Singapore

There are about 15,000 Vietnamese people in Singapore, primarily composed of restaurant/hawker centre service workers and overseas students. Early waves of Vietnamese refugees and immigrants to Singapore in the 1970s mainly include boat people who escaped Vietnam during the aftermath of the Vietnam War, who were initially housed in an ex-military barracks turned refugee camp. 32,457 Vietnamese refugees were hosted in Singapore from 1976 to the early 1990s, with around 5,000 settling throughout the 1970s.

Philippines

During the Indochina refugee crisis, around 400,000 Vietnamese refugees landed on the shores of Palawan in the western Philippines after the fall of South Vietnam in 1975. They were housed in a temporary refugee camp known as the Philippine First Asylum Center (PFAC) in the city of Puerto Princesa. The center was built in 1979 by the Philippine government in partnership with the United Nations High Commission for Refugees through the initiative of the Philippine Catholic Church. Most of the refugees were moved to the Philippine Refugee Processing Center in Bataan before being resettled to other countries. However, by the time the refugee campes were closed in 1996, around 2,710 Vietnamese refugees remained in the country. Unlike other neighboring countries which implemented forced repatriation, the Philippines was the only country that allowed the refugees to stay indefinitely. The refugees established a community called Viet-Ville (French for "Viet-Town"), also in Puerto Princesa. At the time, it became the centre of Vietnamese commerce and culture, complete with Vietnamese restaurants, shops, Catholic churches and Buddhist temples. In the decades that followed however, the Vietnamese population dwindled greatly as they finally got approval for resettlement in the United States, Canada, Australia or Western Europe. By 2005, only two of the former refugees remained, both of whom are married to locals. Viet-Ville today remains a popular destination for local tourists and Vietnamese cuisine still remains popular in the city of Puerto Princesa.

Israel

The number of Vietnamese people in Israel is estimated at 150 to 200. Most of them came between 1976 and 1979 when about 360 Vietnamese refugees were granted political asylum by Prime Minister Menachem Begin. Most later left Israel, mainly for Europe or North America, to reunite with their extended families. Many of the second generation descendants have assimilated into Israeli culture, marrying Israelis, speaking Hebrew and serving in the Israel Defense Forces. A minority choose to keep their culture alive by shunning intermarriage and speaking Vietnamese at home.  Today, the majority of the community lives in the Gush Dan area in the center of Israel but also a few dozen Vietnamese-Israelis or Israelis of Vietnamese origin live in Haifa, Jerusalem and Ofakim.

Relations with Vietnam
Relations between overseas Vietnamese populations and the current government of Vietnam traditionally range between polarities of geniality and overt contempt. Generally, overseas Vietnamese residing in North America, Western Europe, and Australia (which represent the vast majority of overseas Vietnamese populations) are virulently opposed to the existing government of Vietnam. The smaller population of overseas Vietnamese residing in Europe, however, (mainly in Central and East Europe), the Middle East, Africa and Asia, most of whom have been sent for training in formerly communist countries, generally maintain positive or more neutral, if not very friendly relations with the government. Many of these East European Vietnamese are from Northern Vietnam and usually have personal or familial affiliations with the communist regime Those who left before the political exodus of 1975, largely residing in France, generally identify their sentiments as somewhere in between the two polarities. This division is also strongly reflected in their religious adherence. Most of the Vietnamese diaspora living in Western Europe, North America, and Oceania have been religious (Christian, Buddhist, Caodaist) and anti-communist, while the Vietnamese living in Eastern Europe and Asia are more aligned to irreligion, and, to a lesser extent, folk religions and Buddhism.

The former South Vietnamese Prime Minister Nguyễn Cao Kỳ returned to Vietnam in 2004 and was generally positive about his experience. However, Kỳ's reconciliation was met with anger by most overseas Vietnamese, who called him a traitor and a communist collaborator for reconciling and working with the current communist regime. Notable expatriate artists have returned to Vietnam to perform (many of whom are met with scorn and boycott by the expatriate community itself after they do so). Notably, the composer Pham Duy had returned to Ho Chi Minh City (referred to as Saigon by overseas Vietnamese and those living in Vietnam) to live the rest of his life there after living in Midway City, California since 1975. The government in Vietnam used less antagonistic rhetoric to describe those who left the country after 1975. According to the Vietnamese government, while in 1987 only 8,000 overseas Vietnamese returned to Vietnam for the purpose of visiting, that number jumped to 430,000 in 2004.

The government enacted laws to make it easier for overseas Vietnamese to do business in Vietnam, including laws allowing them to own land. Overseas Vietnamese, however, still face discrimination while trying to do business there. The first company in Vietnam to be registered to an Overseas Vietnamese was Highlands Coffee, a successful chain of specialty coffee shops, in 1998.

In June 2007, Vietnamese President Nguyen Minh Triet visited the United States, and one of his scheduled stops was in the vicinity Orange County, home of Little Saigon, the largest Vietnamese community outside of Vietnam. Details of his plans were not announced beforehand due to concerns about massive protests. Despite these efforts, a large crowd of anti-communist protest still occurred. Several thousand people protested in Washington, D.C. and Orange County during his visit.

Relations among the Vietnamese diaspora
There is a significant level of tension amongst the Vietnamese diaspora. Widespread regionalism exists between Vietnamese from North America and Western Europe against Vietnamese from other parts of the world. Former Soviet-aligned nations and other Asian countries have influenced the existing regionalism through frequent negative portrayals; most Vietnamese from Western Europe and North America have long viewed themselves as more civilized and developed. Those from Vietnam, other Asian countries, and occasionally Eastern Europe complain about racism perpetuated by Vietnamese from Western Europe and North America. This treatment was further exacerbated by the election of Donald Trump as President of the United States, with some of Vietnamese in the United States having pro-Trump attitudes while the remaining Vietnamese people being skeptical of him. Flag allegiances were further soured and the generational divide was further exacerbated when the former South Vietnamese flag appeared during the 2021 United States Capitol attack.

See also
Diasporic Vietnamese narratives
Vietnamese Diasporic Music
Overseas Vietnamese Buddhist temples
List of Vietnamese People
Vietnamese Boat People
Growing Up American

Notes

References

Further reading

External links